The Man of My Life is a 1954 West German drama film directed by Erich Engel and starring Marianne Hoppe, René Deltgen and Otto Gebühr. It was shot at the Göttingen Studios and on location in Hamburg. The film's sets were designed by the art director Fritz Maurischat.

Synopsis
When a violinist returns to his home town after fifteen years away he strikes up a relationship with an old flame who is now working as a nurse.

Cast
 Marianne Hoppe as Helga Dargatter
 René Deltgen as Nils Ascan
 Otto Gebühr as Professor Kühn
 Ina Halley as Schwester Agnes
 Malte Jaeger as Dr. Reynold
 Wilfried Seyferth as Dr. Nörenberg
 Gisela Trowe as Schwester Thea
 Dorothea Wieck as Schwester Brigitte
 Karl Ludwig Diehl as Professor Bergstetten
 Peter-Timm Schaufuß as Robert Timm
 Emmy Burg as Frau Nörenberg
 Gustl Busch
 Maria Martinsen
 Inge Meysel as Frau Morawski
 Käte Pontow
 Josef Dahmen
 Rudolf Fenner
 Alexander Hunzinger
 Günther Jerschke
 Ilse Kiewiet

References

Bibliography
 Bock, Hans-Michael & Bergfelder, Tim. The Concise CineGraph. Encyclopedia of German Cinema. Berghahn Books, 2009.

External links 
 

1954 films
1954 drama films
German drama films
West German films
1950s German-language films
Films directed by Erich Engel
German black-and-white films
1950s German films
Films shot at Göttingen Studios